Sirocco is a 1951 American film noir directed by Curtis Bernhardt and starring Humphrey Bogart.

The film name is derived from Sirocco, a strong wind blowing in the Mediterranean, coming from the Sahara desert. It is hot and dry and is said to make people irritable. The film is set in Syria somewhat east of the wind's paths.

Plot
In 1925 Damascus, the native Syrians are engaged in a guerrilla war against the French colonial rule of Syria. Harry Smith is an American black marketeer, secretly selling weapons to the guerillas. As the situation deteriorates, French General LaSalle orders that civilian sympathisers be executed each time his soldiers are killed, but his head of military intelligence, Colonel Feroud, persuades him to alter the plan, and simply detain civilians for 48 hours. Feroud calls in five of the city's profiteers (including Smith and Balukjiaan) and accuses them of selling food at excessive prices. Smith is the only one who appears to be willing to cooperate. After he leaves, they investigate Smith and find he was a war hero in the First World War.

A bomb goes off in a night club where Smith has been eying Violetta whilst drinking with his barber friend Nasir. Violetta is thrown to the floor. Feroud picks her up, but it is Smith who comforts her. Violetta leaves with Feroud and returns to his apartment: it becomes clear that they are lovers.

Feroud presses for negotiations with rebel leader Emir Hassan. LaSalle reluctantly lets him try to arrange a meeting, but refuses to let Feroud make contact directly. A young military officer sent in his place is later found murdered with his throat cut.

Feroud calls in Balukjiaan and accuses him of being a gun-runner. He protests his innocence and suggests Smith instead.

To complicate matters, Harry makes a pass at Feroud's unhappy mistress, Violetta, but she rejects him. Later, she informs Feroud she wants to leave him, but he refuses to let her go.

Harry discovers that Nasir has given his name to the authorities when pressured, and plans his escape. At the same time, Violetta shows up and begs him to take her back to Cairo. Needing to flee himself, he agrees to take her along. However, a French patrol nearly captures Harry. He barely gets away, but has to leave behind his money, and without that, he is soon betrayed to the French.

Facing execution, Harry agrees to help Feroud meet with Hassan. Hassan calls the colonel a fool and dismisses his plea for negotiations, but decides to spare his life when Harry and Feroud's aide Major Leon show up offering a £10,000 ransom. The officers are allowed to leave; Harry is not so lucky. The rebels are angered that he has revealed the location of their headquarters to the French and fear he has sold them out, so they kill him. As Feroud and Leon walk back, they notice that the incessant gunfire and explosions have stopped. Feroud wonders aloud if he has convinced Hassan to be as big a fool.

Cast
 Humphrey Bogart as Harry Smith
 Märta Torén as Violetta
 Lee J. Cobb as Col. Feroud
 Everett Sloane as Gen. LaSalle
 Gerald Mohr as Major Leon
 Zero Mostel as Balukjiaan
 Nick Dennis as Nasir Aboud, Harry's assistant
 Onslow Stevens as Emir Hassan
 Ludwig Donath as Flophouse Proprietor
 David Bond as Achmet
 Harry Cording as Master Sergeant (uncredited)
 Jeff Corey as Feisal (uncredited)

Critical reception
Film critic Bosley Crowther lambasted the film and wrote, "Except for a few moody moments in a plaster night-club, called the Moulin Rouge, and some shadowy shots of sloppy Syrians lying around in dingy catacombs, the scene is no more suggestive of Damascus than a Shriners' convention in New Orleans, on which occasion you would see more fezzes than ever show up in this film.  For the most part—indeed, for the sole part—Sirocco wafts a torpid tale of a slick, sneering gun-runner proving a painful thorn in a nice French colonel's side."

Critic Leonard Maltin gave the film a mixed review, writing, "I'd always read that it was a half-baked attempt to rekindle some of the ingredients that made Casablanca such a success, and that's true.  The setting is Damascus in 1926, when the French Army is battling Syrian insurgents...Sirocco is strictly formula stuff, but it's a perfect example of how Hollywood could take ordinary material and still make it entertaining, through sheer professional polish in the writing, staging, art direction, and casting.  Zero Mostel,  Gerald Mohr, and Nick Dennis head the colorful supporting cast, who perform well under Curtis Bernhardt's direction."

References

External links
 
 
 
 

1951 films
1951 romantic drama films
American romantic drama films
American black-and-white films
Columbia Pictures films
Film noir
Films based on French novels
Films set in 1925
Films directed by Curtis Bernhardt
Films scored by George Antheil
Films set in Damascus
Films set in the French colonial empire
1950s English-language films
1950s American films